John Buchanan (born 7 December 1975) is a British judoka.

Judo career
Buchanan is a four times champion of Great Britain, winning the British Judo Championships in 1995, 1998, 2001 and 2003.

Achievements

References

 

1975 births
Living people
Scottish male judoka
Judoka at the 2000 Summer Olympics
Olympic judoka of Great Britain
Commonwealth Games medallists in judo
Commonwealth Games bronze medallists for Scotland
Judoka at the 2014 Commonwealth Games
Medallists at the 2014 Commonwealth Games